Ewan Pearson (born 1 April 1972) is an English electronic music producer/remixer who works under various aliases including Maas, Sulky Pup, Villa America, World of Apples, and Dirtbox.  He is also in Partial Arts with Al Usher.  He has remixed for artists such as Cortney Tidwell, Seelenluft, Ladytron, Depeche Mode, The Rapture, Goldfrapp, and The Chemical Brothers.  In 2001, Soma Quality Recordings released Small Change, an album whose content was exclusively remix work from Pearson under his guises World of Apples and Maas. His production credits include "Pieces of the People We Love" from The Rapture, as well as Ladytron, Chikinki, Envoy and Jeb Loy Nichols and he programmed two tracks for Gwen Stefani's solo album Love. Angel. Music. Baby. He plays on M83's album Saturdays = Youth. He recently completed production on Tracey Thorn's fourth solo album, Record  released in March 2018.

Early life
Pearson (born 1 April 1972) grew up in Kidderminster where he attended Franche Middle School and Wolverley High School in Wolverley. His father had a keen interest in guitar and played in folk bands. This may have been an early inspiration for Ewan who played both piano and cello in his youth. Indeed, his early interest in synthesisers and programming led him to collaborate with schoolmates Gareth James and James Hill in the band "Sample the Dog". Most of the material was covers of Ewan's heroes New Order, Depeche Mode etc., but he also tried his hand at writing. Pearson admits in recent interviews that his writing was somewhat derivative, but it was his natural ability to accurately reproduce the sounds of his favourite synth bands that gave him a good grounding in programming and production. It was during this time that he developed his trademark production style that can still be heard in his work today. He attended Girton College, Cambridge, where he studied English literature and graduated with a first. He went on to study a master's degree in philosophy and cultural studies at Royal Holloway, University of London which focused in part on the place of dance music in popular culture and resulted in the publication of "Discographies" which he co-wrote with Jeremy Gilbert.

DJ career and production work
Pearson's love of dance music led him to begin DJing whilst still working in his home studio. His first 12" single "Motorcade" was released by small, Birmingham based label Bostin' Records under the artist name "Villa America", the cover of the record was vivid claret and blue which Ewan says had nothing to do with local football team Aston Villa. His success with his first few releases led to interest and eventually a long, successful deal with Soma recordings. Soon the remixes began to take over and it is here that Ewan has had most success and indeed it is where he gets most of his professional satisfaction. He continues to successfully juggle DJing and working in the studio. Pearson regularly appears at Fabric in London, Manumission and Space in Ibiza, the Pulp in Paris, and PanoramaBar in Berlin.

Discography

Albums

Compilations

Mix albums

Remixes

Bibliography
Discographies : dance music, culture, and the politics of sound, Jeremy Gilbert and Ewan Pearson, Routledge, 1999

Interviews
 Ewan Pearson: Mix work – Resident Advisor Feb, 2010

External links
Official Website

RBMA Radio On Demand – Train Wreck Mix – Ewan Pearson (Misericord, Berlin/London)
RBMA Radio On Demand – Emerald Steps – Ewan Pearson (Misericord, Berlin/London)
 In The Mix Page http://www.inthemix.com.au/forum/showthread.php?t=274327

Living people
1972 births
Club DJs
Alumni of Girton College, Cambridge
Alumni of Royal Holloway, University of London
English electronic musicians
English DJs
Remixers
English record producers
English dance musicians
People from Kidderminster
Electronic dance music DJs